Black Empire was a tongue-in-cheek speculative fiction novel by conservative African-American writer George S. Schuyler originally published under his pseudonym of Samuel I. Brooks. The two halves of the book originally ran as weekly serials in the Pittsburgh Courier. "Black Internationale" ran in the Courier from November 1936 to July 1937, "Black Empire" ran from October 1937 to April 1938. Combined and edited in 1993 by Robert A. Hill and R. Kent Rasmussen, editors at UCLA's Marcus Garvey Papers, the collected novel detailed the attempts of a radical African-American group called the Black Internationale, equipped with superscience and led by the charismatic Doctor Belsidus, who succeed in creating their own independent nation on the African continent. The novel is believed to be a lampoon of Marcus Garvey's Back-to-Africa movement and the Black Star Line.

See also

 African American literature
Africanfuturism
 Afrofuturism

References

 Brothers Judd review of Black Empire
 George S. Schuyler Bibliography & Chronology

1938 American novels
Novels by George Schuyler
Works published under a pseudonym
Novels first published in serial form
Novels set in Africa
African-American novels
American speculative fiction novels